The 2000–01 NBA season was the Raptors' sixth season in the National Basketball Association. This was the Raptors' first season without Butch Carter, Tracy McGrady, Doug Christie, and Dee Brown. During the 2000 off-season, the Raptors acquired Corliss Williamson from the Sacramento Kings, and signed free agent Mark Jackson. Basketball Hall of Fame member Lenny Wilkens became the fourth head coach in the team's franchise history. The Raptors lost their first three games, but played above .500 as the season progressed holding a 26–23 record at the All-Star break. At midseason, Williamson was traded to the Detroit Pistons in exchange for Jerome Williams and Eric Montross, while Jackson was traded along with Muggsy Bogues back to his former team, the New York Knicks in exchange for Chris Childs, and Kevin Willis was dealt to the Denver Nuggets in exchange for Keon Clark and Tracy Murray in two other separate midseason trades. The Raptors won 11 of their final 14 games, finishing second in the Central Division with a 47–35 record.

Vince Carter averaged 27.6 points, 5.5 rebounds and 1.5 steals per game, and was named to the All-NBA Second Team, while Antonio Davis averaged 13.7 points, 10.1 rebounds and 1.9 blocks per game. Carter and Davis were both selected for the 2001 NBA All-Star Game. In addition, Alvin Williams provided the team with 9.8 points, 5.0 assists and 1.5 steals per game, while Charles Oakley averaged 9.6 points and 9.5 rebounds per game, and top draft pick Morris Peterson contributed 9.3 points per game, and was named to the NBA All-Rookie First Team.

In their second playoff appearance, the Raptors trailed 2–1 to the 4th-seeded Knicks in the Eastern Conference First Round, but would win the series in five games with a 93–89 Game 5 road win over the Knicks at New York, and winning their first ever playoff series in franchise history. In their first appearance in the Eastern Conference Semi-finals, the Raptors took a 2–1 series lead over regular season MVP Allen Iverson and the Philadelphia 76ers, but would lose the series in seven games, losing Game 7 by one point, 88–87 in Philadelphia. The Sixers would reach the NBA Finals, but would lose in five games to the defending champion Los Angeles Lakers. Following the season, Oakley was traded back to his former team, the Chicago Bulls.

The Raptors would not win another playoff series until 2016.

NBA Draft

Roster

Game log

Preseason 

|- align="center" bgcolor="#ffcccc"
| 1 || October 10 || Minnesota || 96–100 || Air Canada Centre 12,744 || 0–1
|- align="center" bgcolor="#ccffcc"
| 2 || October 12 || Vancouver(at Ottawa) || 97–92 || Corel Centre14,783 || 1–1
|- align="center" bgcolor="#ccffcc"
| 3 || October 14 || @ Cleveland || 113–108 (OT) || Gund Arena9,480 || 2–1
|- align="center" bgcolor="#ffcccc"
| 4 || October 16 || Philadelphia(at Chapel Hill, North Carolina) || 98–107 || Dean Smith Center5,588 || 2–2
|- align="center" bgcolor="#ffcccc"
| 5 || October 18 || Dallas || 94–99 || Air Canada Centre13,229 || 2–3
|- align="center" bgcolor="#ffcccc"
| 6 || October 21 || Charlotte || 66–91 || Air Canada Centre13,647 || 2–4
|- align="center" bgcolor="#ccffcc"
| 7 || October 23 || Indiana || 91–80 || Air Canada Centre 12,893 || 3–4
|- align="center" bgcolor="#ccffcc"
| 8 || October 25 || @ Charlotte || 94–88 || Charlotte Coliseum 12,173 || 4–4
|-

All times are EASTERN time

Regular season standings

Record vs opponents 

(* game decided in overtime)

Regular season 

|- bgcolor="#ffcccc"
| 1
| October 31
| Detroit
| 
| Vince Carter (26)
| Antonio Davis, Charles Oakley, Kevin Willis (10)
| Mark Jackson (12)
| Air Canada Centre19,800
| 0–1

|- bgcolor="#ffcccc"
| 2
| November 1
| @ Philadelphia
| 
| Vince Carter (25)
| Antonio Davis (11)
| Mark Jackson (12)
| First Union Center19,817
| 0–2
|- bgcolor="#ffcccc"
| 3
| November 3
| @ Boston
| 
| Vince Carter (33)
| Antonio Davis (10)
| Mark Jackson (12)
| FleetCenter17,464
| 0–3
|- bgcolor="ccffcc"
| 4
| November 4
| Washington
| 
| Vince Carter (34)
| Kevin Willis (9)
| Mark Jackson (12)
| Air Canada Centre18,726
| 1–3
|- bgcolor="ccffcc"
| 5
| November 7
| Boston
| 
| Antonio Davis (24)
| Charles Oakley (11)
| Mark Jackson (15)
| Air Canada Centre17,379
| 2–3
|- bgcolor="ccffcc"
| 6
| November 10
| Cleveland
| 
| Vince Carter (32)
| Charles Oakley (11)
| Charles Oakley (7)
| Air Canada Centre19,800
| 3–3
|- bgcolor="ccffcc"
| 7
| November 11
| @ Chicago
| 
| Vince Carter (26)
| Antonio Davis (12)
| Charles Oakley (12)
| United Center22,387
| 4–3
|- bgcolor="#ffcccc"
| 8
| November 16
| Portland
| 
| Vince Carter (37)
| Antonio Davis (12)
| Mark Jackson (7)
| Air Canada Centre19,800
| 4–4
|- bgcolor="ccffcc"
| 9
| November 18
| Milwaukee
| 
| Vince Carter (48)
| Antonio Davis (18)
| Mark Jackson (12)
| Air Canada Centre19,800
| 5–4
|- bgcolor="#ffcccc"
| 10
| November 20
| Charlotte
| 
| Vince Carter (20)
| Antonio Davis (12)
| Mark Jackson (7)
| Air Canada Centre17,767
| 5–5
|- bgcolor="ccffcc"
| 11
| November 23
| @ Indiana
| 
| Vince Carter (28)
| Antonio Davis (10)
| Mark Jackson (8)
| Conseco Fieldhouse18,345
| 6–5
|- bgcolor="ccffcc"
| 12
| November 25
| @ New York
| 
| Vince Carter (25)
| Antonio Davis (18)
| Mark Jackson (8)
| Madison Square Garden19,763
| 7–5
|- bgcolor="ccffcc"
| 13
| November 26
| Chicago
| 
| Antonio Davis, Morris Peterson (18)
| Mark Jackson, Charles Oakley (11)
| Mark Jackson (11)
| Air Canada Centre19,800
| 8–5
|- bgcolor="#ffcccc"
| 14
| November 28
| @ Dallas
| 
| Corliss Williamson (22)
| Charles Oakley (14)
| Mark Jackson (9)
| Reunion Arena16,016
| 8–6
|- bgcolor="#ffcccc"
| 15
| November 29
| @ Charlotte
| 
| Antonio Davis (15)
| Antonio Davis (12)
| Mark Jackson (7)
| Charlotte Coliseum12,255
| 8–7

|- bgcolor="ccffcc"
| 16
| December 1
| L.A. Clippers
| 
| Mark Jackson (20)
| Antonio Davis (13)
| Mark Jackson (15)
| Air Canada Centre18,470
| 9–7
|- bgcolor="#ffcccc"
| 17
| December 5
| @ Utah
| 
| Kevin Willis (20)
| Antonio Davis (12)
| Alvin Williams (5)
| Delta Center19,288
| 9–8
|- bgcolor="#ffcccc"
| 18
| December 6
| @ Portland
| 
| Antonio Davis (18)
| Kevin Willis (16)
| Mark Jackson (12)
| Rose Garden19,980
| 9–9
|- bgcolor="ccffcc"
| 19
| December 8
| @ Golden State
| 
| Vince Carter (29)
| Kevin Willis (13)
| Mark Jackson (9)
| The Arena in Oakland18,316
| 10–9
|- bgcolor="#ffcccc"
| 20
| December 10
| Phoenix
| 
| Vince Carter (35)
| Charles Oakley (16)
| Mark Jackson (9)
| Air Canada Centre19,800
| 10–10
|- bgcolor="ccffcc"
| 21
| December 12
| Indiana
| 
| Vince Carter (33)
| Charles Oakley (10)
| Mark Jackson (11)
| Air Canada Centre18,221
| 11–10
|- bgcolor="ccffcc"
| 22
| December 14
| New York
| 
| Vince Carter (24)
| Charles Oakley (11)
| Mark Jackson (7)
| Air Canada Centre19,800
| 12–10
|- bgcolor="#ffcccc"
| 23
| December 15
| @ Milwaukee
| 
| Antonio Davis (25)
| Antonio Davis (12)
| Mark Jackson (8)
| Bradley Center16,432
| 12–11
|- bgcolor="#ffcccc"
| 24
| December 17
| L.A. Lakers
| 
| Vince Carter (31)
| Charles Oakley (18)
| Alvin Williams (7)
| Air Canada Centre19,800
| 12–12
|- bgcolor="ccffcc"
| 25
| December 19
| Utah
| 
| Vince Carter (33)
| Charles Oakley (15)
| Alvin Williams (8)
| Air Canada Centre18,896
| 13–12
|- bgcolor="ccffcc"
| 26
| December 20
| @ Indiana
| 
| Vince Carter (45)
| Antonio Davis (19)
| Mark Jackson (9)
| Conseco Fieldhouse18,345
| 14–12
|- bgcolor="#ffcccc"
| 27
| December 22
| Atlanta
| 
| Vince Carter (20)
| Charles Oakley (16)
| Vince Carter (10)
| Air Canada Centre18,962
| 14–13
|- bgcolor="#ffcccc"
| 28
| December 26
| @ Minnesota
| 
| Vince Carter (32)
| Charles Oakley (14)
| Vince Carter (11)
| Target Center16,828
| 14–14
|- bgcolor="ccffcc"
| 29
| December 28
| @ Denver
| 
| Vince Carter (25)
| Antonio Davis (14)
| Mark Jackson (17)
| Pepsi Center17,700
| 15–14
|- bgcolor="#ffcccc"
| 30
| December 30
| @ Phoenix
| 
| Vince Carter (46)
| Charles Oakley, Corliss Williamson (9)
| Vince Carter (6)
| America West Arena19,023
| 15–15

|- bgcolor="#ffcccc"
| 31
| January 2
| @ L.A. Clippers
| 
| Vince Carter (25)
| Charles Oakley (11)
| Mark Jackson (8)
| Staples Center18,037
| 15–16
|- bgcolor="#ffcccc"
| 32
| January 5
| Dallas
| 
| Vince Carter (33)
| Charles Oakley, Kevin Willis (10)
| Mark Jackson (8)
| Air Canada Centre19,800
| 15–17
|- bgcolor="ccffcc"
| 33
| January 7
| Seattle
| 
| Vince Carter (23)
| Kevin Willis (13)
| Mark Jackson (10)
| Air Canada Centre19,800
| 16–17
|- bgcolor="#ffcccc"
| 34
| January 9
| Houston
| 
| Vince Carter (24)
| Kevin Willis (13)
| Mark Jackson (7)
| Air Canada Centre19,106
| 16–18
|- bgcolor="ccffcc"
| 35
| January 10
| @ Detroit
| 
| Charles Oakley (19)
| Antonio Davis (11)
| Mark Jackson (12)
| The Palace of Auburn Hills17,249
| 17–18
|- bgcolor="ccffcc"
| 36
| January 12
| @ Boston
| 
| Vince Carter (25)
| Antonio Davis (12)
| Mark Jackson, Alvin Williams (7)
| FleetCenter17,775
| 18–18
|- bgcolor="ccffcc"
| 37
| January 14
| Charlotte
| 
| Vince Carter (40)
| Charles Oakley (10)
| Mark Jackson (14)
| Air Canada Centre19,800
| 19–18
|- bgcolor="#ffcccc"
| 38
| January 16
| @ Houston
| 
| Vince Carter (22)
| Antonio Davis (9)
| Mark Jackson (7)
| Compaq Center13,195
| 19–19
|- bgcolor="ccffcc"
| 39
| January 17
| @ San Antonio
| 
| Vince Carter (27)
| Charles Oakley (12)
| Mark Jackson (10)
| Alamodome17,044
| 20–19
|- bgcolor="ccffcc"
| 40
| January 19
| Washington
| 
| Vince Carter (25)
| Charles Oakley (10)
| Vince Carter (7)
| Air Canada Centre19,800
| 21–19
|- bgcolor="ccffcc"
| 41
| January 21
| @ Philadelphia
| 
| Vince Carter (39)
| Charles Oakley (14)
| Mark Jackson (13)
| First Union Center20,583
| 22–19
|- bgcolor="#ffcccc"
| 42
| January 23
| @ Orlando
| 
| Vince Carter (33)
| Charles Oakley (13)
| Vince Carter (7)
| TD Waterhouse Centre16,131
| 22–20
|- bgcolor="#ffcccc"
| 43
| January 24
| @ Miami
| 
| Vince Carter (21)
| Keon Clark, Antonio Davis (9)
| Mark Jackson (6)
| American Airlines Arena16,500
| 22–21
|- bgcolor="ccffcc"
| 44
| January 27
| @ Chicago
| 
| Antonio Davis, Alvin Williams (15)
| Charles Oakley (14)
| Mark Jackson (12)
| United Center22,497
| 23–21
|- bgcolor="ccffcc"
| 45
| January 30
| Philadelphia
| 
| Morris Peterson (22)
| Charles Oakley (12)
| Mark Jackson, Alvin Williams (6)
| Air Canada Centre19,800
| 24–21
|- bgcolor="#ffcccc"
| 46
| January 31
| @ Atlanta
| 
| Morris Peterson (20)
| Antonio Davis (15)
| Mark Jackson (12)
| Philips Arena12,799
| 24–22

|- bgcolor="#ffcccc"
| 47
| February 3
| Minnesota
| 
| Antonio Davis (25)
| Antonio Davis (13)
| Mark Jackson (10)
| Air Canada Centre19,800
| 24–23
|- bgcolor="ccffcc"
| 48
| February 5
| Boston
| 
| Vince Carter (29)
| Antonio Davis, Charles Oakley (12)
| Mark Jackson (8)
| Air Canada Centre18,521
| 25–23
|- bgcolor="ccffcc"
| 49
| February 8
| Denver
| 
| Vince Carter (31)
| Antonio Davis (12)
| Alvin Williams (9)
| Air Canada Centre18,041
| 26–23
|- bgcolor="ccffcc"
| 50
| February 13
| @ Cleveland
| 
| Vince Carter (33)
| Antonio Davis (13)
| Mark Jackson (16)
| Gund Arena15,079
| 27–23
|- bgcolor="#ffcccc"
| 51
| February 15
| Miami
| 
| Vince Carter (28)
| Charles Oakley (15)
| Mark Jackson (9)
| Air Canada Centre19,800
| 27–24
|- bgcolor="#ffcccc"
| 52
| February 18
| San Antonio
| 
| Morris Peterson (14)
| Antonio Davis (8)
| Mark Jackson (9)
| Air Canada Centre19,800
| 27–25
|- bgcolor="ccffcc"
| 53
| February 20
| Golden State
| 
| Vince Carter (33)
| Vince Carter (13)
| Mark Jackson (12)
| Air Canada Centre18,119
| 28–25
|- bgcolor="#ffcccc"
| 54
| February 21
| @ New Jersey
| 
| Vince Carter (39)
| Antonio Davis (10)
| Mark Jackson (7)
| Continental Airlines Arena15,475
| 28–26
|- bgcolor="#ffcccc"
| 55
| February 23
| Sacramento
| 
| Vince Carter (38)
| Antonio Davis, Charles Oakley (12)
| Alvin Williams (13)
| Air Canada Centre19,800
| 28–27
|- bgcolor="ccffcc"
| 56
| February 24
| @ Washington
| 
| Vince Carter (19)
| Tracy Murray, Charles Oakley, Morris Peterson (7)
| Chris Childs, Alvin Williams (8)
| MCI Center20,674
| 29–27
|- bgcolor="ccffcc"
| 57
| February 27
| Cleveland
| 
| Vince Carter (32)
| Charles Oakley (13)
| Alvin Williams (7)
| Air Canada Centre17,202
| 30–27
|- bgcolor="ccffcc"
| 58
| February 28
| @ Atlanta
| 
| Vince Carter (32)
| Antonio Davis (15)
| Alvin Williams (9)
| Philips Arena14,159
| 31–27

|- bgcolor="ccffcc"
| 59
| March 2
| New Jersey
| 
| Vince Carter (38)
| Charles Oakley (14)
| Charles Oakley (8)
| Air Canada Centre19,800
| 32–27
|- bgcolor="ccffcc"
| 60
| March 4
| New York
| 
| Vince Carter (25)
| Antonio Davis (9)
| Alvin Williams (7)
| Air Canada Centre19,800
| 33–27
|- bgcolor="#ffcccc"
| 61
| March 6
| @ Sacramento
| 
| Vince Carter, Antonio Davis (25)
| Vince Carter, Antonio Davis (9)
| Alvin Williams (4)
| ARCO Arena17,317
| 33–28
|- bgcolor="#ffcccc"
| 62
| March 7
| @ L.A. Lakers
| 
| Vince Carter (28)
| Charles Oakley (10)
| Charles Oakley (6)
| Staples Center18,997
| 33–29
|- bgcolor="ccffcc"
| 63
| March 9
| @ Seattle
| 
| Vince Carter (32)
| Charles Oakley (12)
| Alvin Williams (8)
| KeyArena17,072
| 34–29
|- bgcolor="ccffcc"
| 64
| March 11
| @ Vancouver
| 
| Vince Carter (25)
| Vince Carter (8)
| Charles Oakley (6)
| General Motors Place19,193
| 35–29
|- bgcolor="#ffcccc"
| 65
| March 13
| Milwaukee
| 
| Vince Carter (24)
| Keon Clark (10)
| Chris Childs (8)
| Air Canada Centre19,800
| 35–30
|- bgcolor="#ffcccc"
| 66
| March 15
| @ New York
| 
| Vince Carter (22)
| Jerome Williams (9)
| Chris Childs (8)
| Madison Square Garden19,763
| 35–31
|- bgcolor="ccffcc"
| 67
| March 20
| Indiana
| 
| Vince Carter (33)
| Charles Oakley (9)
| Chris Childs, Alvin Williams (7)
| Air Canada Centre19,800
| 36–31
|- bgcolor="#ffcccc"
| 68
| March 21
| @ Charlotte
| 
| Vince Carter (23)
| Keon Clark, Antonio Davis (6)
| Alvin Williams (9)
| Charlotte Coliseum15,746
| 36–32
|- bgcolor="ccffcc"
| 69
| March 23
| Atlanta
| 
| Vince Carter (29)
| Alvin Williams (10)
| Alvin Williams (14)
| Air Canada Centre19,554
| 37–32
|- bgcolor="ccffcc"
| 70
| March 25
| Vancouver
| 
| Vince Carter (24)
| Antonio Davis (14)
| Alvin Williams (8)
| Air Canada Centre19,800
| 38–32
|- bgcolor="ccffcc"
| 71
| March 27
| @ Miami
| 
| Vince Carter (38)
| Charles Oakley (14)
| Alvin Williams (11)
| American Airlines Arena18,221
| 39–32
|- bgcolor="ccffcc"
| 72
| March 30
| New Jersey
| 
| Vince Carter (27)
| Antonio Davis (11)
| Alvin Williams (8)
| Air Canada Centre19,217
| 40–32

|- bgcolor="#ffcccc"
| 73
| April 1
| Orlando
| 
| Vince Carter (28)
| Charles Oakley (9)
| Vince Carter (11)
| Air Canada Centre19,971
| 40–33
|- bgcolor="ccffcc"
| 74
| April 3
| Philadelphia
| 
| Vince Carter (26)
| Eric Montross (11)
| Alvin Williams (13)
| Air Canada Centre19,800
| 41–33
|- bgcolor="ccffcc"
| 75
| April 4
| @ Cleveland
| 
| Vince Carter (32)
| Charles Oakley (12)
| Alvin Williams (10)
| Gund Arena15,414
| 42–33
|- bgcolor="ccffcc"
| 76
| April 6
| @ Orlando
| 
| Antonio Davis (31)
| Antonio Davis (13)
| Vince Carter (8)
| TD Waterhouse Centre17,248
| 43–33
|- bgcolor="ccffcc"
| 77
| April 8
| Chicago
| 
| Vince Carter (33)
| Antonio Davis (14)
| Vince Carter, Alvin Williams (6)
| Air Canada Centre19,800
| 44–33
|- bgcolor="#ffcccc"
| 78
| April 11
| @ Detroit
| 
| Vince Carter (22)
| Antonio Davis (13)
| Alvin Williams (11)
| The Palace of Auburn Hills18,790
| 44–34
|- bgcolor="ccffcc"
| 79
| April 13
| Miami
| 
| Vince Carter (27)
| Antonio Davis (13)
| Vince Carter (8)
| Air Canada Centre20,104
| 45–34
|- bgcolor="#ffcccc"
| 80
| April 14
| @ Milwaukee
| 
| Keon Clark (18)
| Antonio Davis (8)
| Alvin Williams (11)
| Bradley Center18,717
| 45–35
|- bgcolor="ccffcc"
| 81
| April 17
| Detroit
| 
| Vince Carter (21)
| Antonio Davis, Charles Oakley (11)
| Alvin Williams (12)
| Air Canada Centre19,800
| 46–35
|- bgcolor="ccffcc"
| 82
| April 18
| @ Washington
| 
| Vince Carter (34)
| Charles Oakley (11)
| Alvin Williams (11)
| MCI Center16,427
| 47–35

Playoffs

Game log 

|- align="center" bgcolor="#ffcccc"
| 1
| April 22
| @ New York
| L 85–92
| Davis, Williams (19)
| Antonio Davis (15)
| Alvin Williams (8)
| Madison Square Garden19,763
| 0–1
|- align="center" bgcolor="#ccffcc"
| 2
| April 26
| @ New York
| W 94–74
| Alvin Williams (23)
| Antonio Davis (12)
| Chris Childs (7)
| Madison Square Garden19,763
| 1–1
|- align="center" bgcolor="#ffcccc"
| 3
| April 29
| New York
| L 89–97
| Antonio Davis (21)
| Antonio Davis (12)
| Chris Childs (9)
| Air Canada Centre20,217
| 1–2
|- align="center" bgcolor="#ccffcc"
| 4
| May 2
| New York
| W 100–93
| Vince Carter (32)
| Antonio Davis (9)
| Carter, Childs (4)
| Air Canada Centre20,282
| 2–2
|- align="center" bgcolor="#ccffcc"
| 5
| May 4
| @ New York
| W 93–89
| Vince Carter (27)
| Antonio Davis (12)
| Chris Childs (9)
| Madison Square Garden19,763
| 3–2
|-

|- align="center" bgcolor="#ccffcc"
| 1
| May 6
| @ Philadelphia
| W 96–93
| Vince Carter (35)
| Antonio Davis (12)
| Vince Carter (7)
| First Union Center20,892
| 1–0
|- align="center" bgcolor="#ffcccc"
| 2
| May 9
| @ Philadelphia
| L 92–97
| Vince Carter (28)
| Antonio Davis (10)
| Chris Childs (9)
| First Union Center20,870
| 1–1
|- align="center" bgcolor="#ccffcc"
| 3
| May 11
| Philadelphia
| W 102–78
| Vince Carter (50)
| Antonio Davis (14)
| Chris Childs (10)
| Air Canada Centre20,436
| 2–1
|- align="center" bgcolor="#ffcccc"
| 4
| May 13
| Philadelphia
| L 79–84
| Vince Carter (25)
| Davis, Oakley (11)
| Chris Childs (7)
| Air Canada Centre20,351
| 2–2
|- align="center" bgcolor="#ffcccc"
| 5
| May 16
| @ Philadelphia
| L 88–121
| Vince Carter (16)
| three players tied (5)
| Chris Childs (8)
| First Union Center20,939
| 2–3
|- align="center" bgcolor="#ccffcc"
| 6
| May 18
| Philadelphia
| W 101–89
| Vince Carter (39)
| Antonio Davis (13)
| Morris Peterson (7)
| Air Canada Centre20,499
| 3–3
|- align="center" bgcolor="#ffcccc"
| 7
| May 20
| @ Philadelphia
| L 87–88
| Antonio Davis (23)
| Charles Oakley (10)
| Vince Carter (9)
| First Union Center20,848
| 3–4
|-

Player statistics

Regular season 

* Statistics include only games with the Raptors

Playoffs

Award winners 
 Vince Carter, NBA All-Star Game Appearance, Starter
 Antonio Davis, NBA All-Star Game Appearance
 Vince Carter, All-NBA Second Team
 Morris Peterson, All-NBA Rookie First Team

Transactions

References

External links 
 2000–01 Toronto Raptors season at Basketball Reference
 2000–01 Toronto Raptors season at Database Basketball

Toronto Raptors seasons
Toronto
Tor